Freaks and Greeks may refer to:
 "Freaks & Greeks" (Drawn Together), an episode of Drawn Together.
 "Freaks and Greeks" (Legends of Tomorrow), an episode of DC's Legends of Tomorrow.

See also 
 Freaks and Geeks, an American TV series